The Kingdom of Capsus was a Romano-Berber kingdom in North Africa, centered around its capital, Capsa. It was founded as a result of the collapse of Roman rule in North Africa, corresponding with the arrival of the Vandals and the establishment of the Vandalic Kingdom in the 440s–470s.

References

Citations

Bibliography

Capsus
Capsus
Barbarian kingdoms
Mauro-Roman Kingdom